Micromacromia flava is a species of dragonfly in the family Libellulidae. It is found in Angola and Zambia.

References 

Libellulidae
Taxonomy articles created by Polbot
Insects described in 1947